François Hippolyte Lalaisse was born in Nancy in 1810 and died in Paris in 1884. He was a French painter and illustrator.

François Hippolyte Lalaisse was taught by Nicolas-Toussaint Charlet and later became a professor at the "École polytechnique (France)" teaching there from 1839 to 1877. He was the father of Amédée de Noé. Amongst his illustrations were those for Pierre Henri Charpentier's "Costumes et vues pittoresques de la Bretagne" published in 1848. These sketches are invaluable as records of the types of costumes and dress worn in various regions of Brittany.

Lalaisse was a regular exhibitor at the Paris Salon, his first venture there being in 1835. Apart from the large number of lithographs depicting the regional costumes worn in Brittany he also published lithographs depicting the military uniforms of the times.  Several Lalaisse lithographs can be seen in the Musée du Faouët. His paintings can also be seen in the art museums of Bagnères-de-Bigorre, Chaumont and Lons-le-Saulnier as well as various costume sketches which are held in Marseilles's Musée des Civilisations de l’Europe et de la Méditerranée.

Gallery

Notes and references

1810 births
1884 deaths
19th-century French painters
French male painters
19th-century French male artists